Flybmi operated the following scheduled destinations as of February 2019. It entered administration on 16 February 2019, resulting in the termination of all flights.

Destinations

See also
bmibaby
British Midland International

References

External links

Lists of airline destinations